Lyndsay Kohlet (formerly Glohe; born 6 October 1988) is an Australian soccer player who last played for Sydney FC in the Australian W-League.

Kohlet grew up in Orange, New South Wales, attending Orange High School.

She was a member of the NSW Sapphires White squad at the 2005 Women's National Football Championships.

Kohlet made her debut against Melbourne Victory on 25 October 2008. Kohlet played under the surname Glohe during spells at Central Coast Mariners and Canberra United.

Honours

International
Australia
 AFF Women's Championship: 2008

References

External links
 Sydney FC profile

1988 births
Living people
Australian women's soccer players
Central Coast Mariners FC (A-League Women) players
Canberra United FC players
Sydney FC (A-League Women) players
A-League Women players
Women's association football defenders
People from Orange, New South Wales
Sportswomen from New South Wales
Soccer players from New South Wales